White Oak Branch is a stream in Audrain County in the U.S. state of Missouri. It is a tributary of the South Fork of the Salt River.

White Oak Branch was named for the white oak trees along its course.

See also
List of rivers of Missouri

References

Rivers of Audrain County, Missouri
Rivers of Missouri